Antje Geertje (Ans) Markus (born January 29, 1947) is a Dutch painter and sculptor.

Biography
Markus was born in Halfweg, a province of North Holland. She is known for her paintings of a woman in white drapings. Markus is a self-taught artist who deploys a realistic painting style. 

Markus’ first exposition was opened in 1981. In 1995, she opened her own exposition space. In 2003, her 25th anniversary as a painter was celebrated with the release of a book which featured a vast collection of her paintings.  

Recently, more of her work has been displayed in museums and expositions across The Netherlands. In 2007, 2008, and 2010, her work was displayed in the Noord Brabants Museum, Kunstkerk Bakenes Haarlem Exposition, and Jan Van Der Togt  Museum respectively.

Style and Technique 
While Markus can be generally defined as a fashion painter, she is more specifically known for her work depicting women in white linen draping. These paintings are crafted using a realistic style, and many of these paintings feature the same woman. Interestingly, many of these works also feature a relationship to animals. In one of these pieces, the woman in drapings appears to have the horns of a ram whereas in another, she has the horns of a bull. Throughout Markus’ collection, this woman can also be seen with scorpions, fish, bugs, and snakes.  In all of these paintings featuring the woman in drapes, her head is tightly wound by the draping and her eyes are concealed.

Markus has also worked on sculptures which feature a woman whose eyes are concealed by cloth.

Awards 
In 2009, Markus was recognized as the Dutch painter of the year.

References

External links 
 
 

1947 births
Living people
20th-century Dutch women artists
21st-century Dutch women artists
Dutch painters
Dutch women painters
People from Haarlemmerliede en Spaarnwoude
Realist painters
Dutch contemporary artists